Robert Schuman Medal or Robert Schuman Prize may refer to
 Robert Schuman Medal, EPP Group
 Robert Schuman Prize, Alfred Toepfer Foundation